Nickel selenide is the inorganic compound  with the formula NiSe.  As for many metal chalcogenides, the phase diagram for nickel(II) selenide is complicated.  Two other selenides of nickel are known, NiSe2 with a pyrite structure, and Ni2Se3. Additionally, NiSe is usually nonstoichiometric and is often described with the formula Ni1−xSe, with 0 < x < 0.15.  This material is a semi-conducting solid, and can be obtained as in the form of a black fine powder, or silver if obtained in the form of larger crystals.  Nickel(II) selenide is insoluble in all solvents, but can be degraded by strongly oxidizing acids.

Synthesis and structure
Typically, NiSe is prepared by high temperature reaction of the elements.  Such reactions typically afford mixed phase products.  Milder methods have also been described using more specialised techniques such as reactions of the elements in liquid ammonia in a pressure vessel.

Like many related materials, nickel(II) selenide adopts the nickel arsenide motif.  In this structure, nickel is octahedral and the selenides are in trigonal prismatic sites.

References 

Nickel compounds
Selenides
Nickel arsenide structure type